The Siamese coup d’état of June 1933 was considered the first time in Thai history that the military successfully overthrew the constitutional government. The coup took place peacefully on 20 June 1933 in Bangkok. The coup was led by Colonel Phraya Phahon Pholphayuhasena against the premiership of the Premier Phraya Manopakorn Nititada. The coup was in effect a counter-coup against the dictatorial policies of Phraya Mano stemming from the Yellow cover dossier crisis.

Background
After the Siamese revolution of 1932, the first coup of Thailand's history occurred on 1 April 1933 by conservative and monarchist elites, led by Phraya Manopakorn Nititada (Mano), amid national debate surrounding the Draft National Economic Plan (Yellow cover dossier), proposed by Pridi Banomyong, progressive leader of the Khana Ratsadon, which was deemed to be a communist threat by King Prajadhipok and Mano.

Prelude
On 18 June, Army Colonel Phraya Phahol Pholphayuhasena (or Phot Phahonyothin), a member of the People's Party and a minister of state resigned from his seat on the People's Committee, citing health reasons. In fact he and Naval Commander Luang Supphachalasai, with the help of young military officers, were conspiring to overthrow Phraya Mano's government. With the support of the army, the navy, civilian factions within the People's Party, and the support of most of Bangkok's populace, Phraya Phahol was able to act.

The coup 

On 20 June, army chief Luang Phibunsongkhram, navy chief Luang Supachalasai, and Phraya Phahon seized the National Assembly building and proclaimed themselves as the legitimate government. Citing the fact that the present government has acted illegally in dissolving the assembly and that they would return the constitution, which the previous administration had suspended. Phraya Phahol appointed himself the country's second prime minister and Luang Supachalasai a minister of state. He immediately recalled the People's Assembly and asked the Speaker to submit to King Prajadhipok at the Klai Kangwon Palace in Hua Hin, the reasons for the coup. The King duly accepted. He also pardoned Pridi and recalled him from exile. The coup was the first that was successfully carried out by the military against a civilian government in Thailand.

Aftermath and legacy 
Immediate resistance to the coup was limited and quickly dissolved as Phraya Mano resigned and escaped the capital by rail to Penang (then part of British Malaya), where he died in 1948. Phraya Songsuradet and others were barred from entering politics. This would eventually result in the Songsuradet Rebellion in 1939.

Pridi Phanomyong eventually returned to Siam on 29 September 1933, but not returning to government immediately. He became an academic and founder of Thammasat University in 1934. He would eventually become one of the most important players in Thai history. During the Second World War he became Regent of Thailand (1944–1946) and Prime Minister of Thailand in 1946. However, the label of communist would never leave him.

References 

 นายหนหวย (ศิลปชัย ชาญเฉลิม), เจ้าฟ้าประชาธิปก ราชันผู้นิราศ, โรงพิมพ์วัชรินทร์, 2530
 ม.จ. พูนพิศมัย ดิสกุล, สิ่งที่ข้าพเจ้าได้พบเห็น (ภาคต้น), สำนักพิมพ์มติชน, พ.ศ. 2543
 โพยม โรจนวิภาต (อ.ก. รุ่งแสง), พ. ๒๗ สายลับพระปกเกล้า พระปกเกล้าฯ (ฉบับพิมพ์ครั้งที่ ๒) พ.ศ. 2547

Military coups in Thailand
coup d'état
Siamese coup d'état
1930s coups d'état and coup attempts
Rebellions in Thailand
Battles and conflicts without fatalities
June 1933 events